The Men's 400m T13 had its first round held on September 9, beginning at 17:15 and the Final on September 10, at 19:05.

Medalists

Results

References
Round 1 - Heat 1
Round 1 - Heat 2
Final A

Athletics at the 2008 Summer Paralympics